The GS Caltex Maekyung Open, as it is known for sponsorship reasons, is a professional golf tournament that takes place in Seoul, South Korea. It was established in 1982, replacing the Korea Open as the South Korean event on the Asia Golf Circuit. Between 1999 and 2009 (except for 2004) it was a stop on the Asian Tour, and then in 2010 it became part of the OneAsia Tour schedule. In 2018 and 2019 it once again became a fixture on the Asian Tour.

In 2005, Korean Choi Sang-ho won the tournament and set an Asian Tour record as the oldest winner on tour at 50 years and 145 days. 

This tournament has generally been staged at the Nam Seoul Country Club. It has only been staged in four venues. The other venues that have been used are Lakeside in 1998, 1999, 2004 and 2006, Gwanak in 1984 and Elysian Gangchon in 2020.

Winners

Sources:

Notes

References

External links
Coverage on the Asian Tour's official site

Korean Tour events
Asia Golf Circuit events
Asian Tour events
Golf tournaments in South Korea
Sport in Seoul
Recurring sporting events established in 1982
1982 establishments in South Korea
Spring (season) events in South Korea